Maarten Cornelis Haverkamp (born 15 March 1974 in Langbroek) is a former Dutch politician. As a member of the Christian Democratic Appeal (Christen-Democratisch Appèl) he was an MP from 26 July 2002 to 17 June 2010 and from 26 October 2010 to 19 September 2012. He focused on matters of mass media policy, aviation and public transport.

References 
  Parlement.com biography

1974 births
Living people
Christian Democratic Appeal politicians
Protestant Church Christians from the Netherlands
Members of the House of Representatives (Netherlands)
Municipal councillors in North Holland
People from Wijk bij Duurstede
21st-century Dutch politicians